Ženski vaterpolo klub Partizan (Serbian Cyrillic: Женски ватерполо клуб Партизан) is a female water polo club from Belgrade, Serbia. ŽVK Partizan is one of the sport clubs in Serbia that are part of sport society Partizan. Partizan's home terrain is the pool which is part of the Sportski centar Voždovac na Banjici complex. The club is supported by Grobari, fans of all sport clubs competing under the name of Partizan Belgrade.

Honours

National Cup: 1
 2012–13

See also
VK Partizan

External links
 ŽVK Partizan at srbijasport.net

Water polo clubs in Serbia
Sport in Belgrade